Faridunovka (Färiźun) is a rural locality (a village) in Sergiopolsky Selsoviet, Davlekanovsky District, Bashkortostan, Russia. The population was 134 as of 2010. There are 2 streets.

Geography 
Faridunovka is located 6 km northeast of Davlekanovo (the district's administrative centre) by road. Davlekanovo is the nearest rural locality.

References 

Rural localities in Davlekanovsky District